AD 34 (XXXIV) was a common year starting on Friday (link will display the full calendar) of the Julian calendar. At the time, it was known as the Year of the Consulship of Persicus and Vitellius (or, less frequently, year 787 Ab urbe condita). The denomination AD 34 for this year has been used since the early medieval period, when the Anno Domini calendar era became the prevalent method in Europe for naming years.

Events

By place

Roman Empire 
 The Roman aqueduct Pont du Gard is constructed, running for 50 km, ending at Nîmes (approximate date).
 Naevius Sutorius Macro gains favour in the Roman Empire by prostituting his wife Ennia Thrasylla to Caligula.
 Stephen, one of the original seven deacons of the Christian Church, is martyred for his faith.
 Saul of Tarsus, on the road to Damascus, is converted to Christianity, and becomes Paul the Apostle.
 Paul the Apostle and Barnabas start preaching the gospel to the Gentiles.
 Rome intervenes in Armenia (AD 34–37).

Europe 
 The original inhabitants of Dacia revolt against the Sarmatian tribe of Iazyges, who had enslaved them.

Births 
 December 4 – Aulus Persius Flaccus, Roman poet (d. AD 62)
 Mariamne, daughter of Herod Agrippa I (approximate date)
 Zhang Daoling, Chinese Taoist master (d. 156)

Deaths 
 Artaxias III, Roman client king of Armenia (b. 13 BC)
 Philip the Tetrarch, Jewish ruler of Batanaea
 Stephen, Jewish martyr of Christianity (stoned to death)

References 

0034

als:30er#34